ASUS ZenUI is a front-end touch interface developed by ASUS with partners, featuring a full touch user interface. ZenUI is used by Asus for their Android phones and tablets, and is not available for licensing by external parties. ZenUI also comes with Asus-made apps preloaded like ZenLink (PC Link, Share Link, Party Link & Remote Link).

History
Before ZenUI, Asus made a front-end interface for Android phones and tablets called ASUS WaveShare UI. The ZenUI made its debut in Asus Zenfone Series, Asus MemoPad 7 (ME176C) and Asus Padfone Mini (2014).

WaveShare UI
ASUS WaveShare UI was a front-end touch interface developed by ASUS & partners. WaveShare UI was used by Asus for Android smartphones and tablet computers and was not available for licensing by external parties. WaveShare UI was originally released on the Asus PadFone hybrid smartphone/tablet, and was later used on other Asus products. The last gadget to use the WaveShare UI was the ASUS MeMO Pad HD 7.

Gadgets that used Asus WaveShare UI

Asus PadFone Infinity (A80)
Asus Fonepad Note 6 (ME560CG)
Asus New PadFone Infinity
Asus PadFone 2 (A68)
Asus Eee Pad Transformer
Asus Slider Pad
Asus Eee Pad Slider
Asus Fonepad 7(ME372cg)

Versions
Asus ZenUI can be updated in the Google Play Store

First Release: 1.2.0.140918 
Preloaded Apps:

 Smart Saving (Power Saver)
 Do It Later
 Movie Studio
 Omlet Chat
 Party Link
 Mirror App
 PC Link (Zenfone 5 and 6 only)
 Quick Memo (Zenfone 5 and 6 only)
 Remote Link
 Share Link
 Splendid
 SuperNote
 Asus WebStorage
 What's Next App
 Weather App
 MyASUS
 Audio Wizard

Recent Release : 2.2.0.14_160307 
Preloaded Apps:

 Smart Saving (Power Saver)
 Do It Later
 Movie Studio
 Omlet Chat
 Party Link
 Mirror App
 PC Link (Availability for Zenfone 4)
 Quick Memo (Availability for Zenfone 4)
 Remote Link
 Share Link
 Splendid
 SuperNote
 Asus WebStorage
 What's Next App
 Weather App
 System Update App on Menu
 Data Transfer
 MyASUS
 Audio Wizard

Phones running Asus ZenUI

Phone
 Asus ZenFone 4 (A400CG)
 Asus ZenFone 4 (A400CXG)
 Asus ZenFone 4 (A450CG)
 Asus ZenFone C (ZC451CG)
 Asus ZenFone 5 (A500CG)
 Asus ZenFone 5 (A501CG)
 Asus ZenFone 5 LTE (A500KL)
 Asus ZenFone 5 Lite (A502CG)
 Asus ZenFone 6 (A600CG)
 Asus ZenFone 6 (A601CG)
 Asus ZenFone 2 (ZE500CL)
 Asus ZenFone 2 (ZE550ML)
 Asus ZenFone 2 (ZE551ML)
 Asus ZenFone 2 Laser (ZE600KL)
 Asus ZenFone 2 Laser (ZE550KL)
 Asus ZenFone 2 Laser (ZE551KL)
 Asus ZenFone 2 Laser (ZE500KG)
 Asus ZenFone 2 Laser (ZE500KL)
 Asus ZenFone Zoom (ZX551ML)
 Asus ZenFone Selfie (ZD551KL)
 Asus ZenFone Go (ZC500TG)
 Asus ZenFone Go (ZC451TG)
 Asus ZenFone Go (ZB450KL)
 Asus ZenFone Go (ZB452KG)
 Asus ZenFone Go (ZB500KG)
 Asus ZenFone Go (ZB500KL)
 Asus ZenFone Go (ZB551KL)
 Asus ZenFone Go (ZB690KG)
 Asus ZenFone Go TV (ZB551KL)
 Asus ZenFone Max (ZC550KL)
 Asus ZenFone 3 (ZE520KL)
 Asus ZenFone 3 (ZE552KL)
 Asus ZenFone 3 Ultra (ZU680KL)
 Asus ZenFone 3 Deluxe (ZS570KL)
 Asus ZenFone 3 Deluxe Lite (ZS550KL)
 Asus ZenFone 3 Laser (ZC551KL)
 Asus ZenFone 3 Max (ZC520TL)
 Asus ZenFone 3s Max (ZC521TL)
 Asus ZenFone 3 Max 5.5" (ZC553KL)
 Asus ZenFone 3 Zoom (ZE553KL)
 Asus ZenFone AR (ZS571KL)
 Asus ZenFone Live (ZB501KL)
 Asus ZenFone 4 (ZE554KL)
 Asus ZenFone 4 Pro (ZS551KL)
 Asus ZenFone 4 Selfie Lite (ZB553KL)
 Asus ZenFone 4 Selfie (ZD553KL)
 Asus ZenFone 4 Selfie Pro (ZD552KL)
 Asus ZenFone 4 Max (ZC520KL)
 Asus ZenFone 4 Max (ZC554KL)
 Asus ZenFone 4 Max Plus (ZC554KL)
 Asus ZenFone 4 Max Pro (ZC554KL)
 Asus ZenFone V (V520KL)
 Asus Pegasus 3
 Asus Live (G500TG)
 Asus ZenFone Live (L1) (ZA550KL)
 Asus ZenFone Max (M1) (ZB555KL)
 Asus ZenFone Max Plus (M1) (ZB570TL)
 Asus ZenFone 5 (ZE620KL)
 Asus ZenFone 5Z (ZS620KL)
 Asus ZenFone 5 Lite/5Q (ZC600KL)
 Asus ZenFone 6 (ZS630KL)
 Asus ZenFone 7 (ZS671KS)
 Asus ZenFone 8

Tablets
Asus MeMO Pad 7 (ME176C)
Asus MeMO Pad 7 (ME176CX)
Asus MeMO Pad 7 (ME572C)
Asus MeMO Pad 8 (ME181C)
Asus Fonepad Note 6 (ME560CG) (Via software update ; Formerly using ASUS WaveShare UI)
Asus Fonepad 7 (FE170CG)
Asus Fonepad 7 (FE171CG)
Asus Fonepad 7 (ME372CG)(Via Over the Air update)
Asus Fonepad 7 (ME373CG)(Via Over the Air update)
Asus Fonepad 7 (FE375CG)
Asus Fonepad 7 (FE375CXG)
Asus Fonepad 7 (FE375CL)
Asus Fonepad 8 (FE380CG)
Asus Zenpad 10

Hybrid Phones

Asus Padfone mini (PF400CG)
Asus Padfone mini with 4G LTE (PF451CL)
Asus Padfone Infinity (A80) (Via software update ; Formerly using ASUS WaveShare UI)
Asus Padfone 2 (A68) (Via software update ; Formerly using ASUS WaveShare UI)
Asus New Padfone Infinity (A86) (Via software update ; Formerly using ASUS WaveShare UI)
Asus Padfone S with 4G LTE (PF500KL)

Hybrid Laptops

Asus Transformer Pad (TF103C)

References

Mobile operating systems
Android (operating system) software
Asus mobile phones
Proprietary commercial software for Linux